Linga (Elinga) is a Bantu language of the Soko–Kele group, spoken in the Democratic Republic of the Congo.

References

Soko-Kele languages
Languages of the Democratic Republic of the Congo